Y-Traxx was a band consisting of DJ Laurent David, Frédéric De Backer and TC Process. Their EP, Mystery Land, made No. 63 on the UK Singles Chart in 1997  and reached No. 70 on re-release with additional vocals by Neve in 2003.

References

Musical trios
Trance music groups